The 13th National Games of China were held in Tianjin and Luoyang, Henan, from August to September 2017.

Host bidding
In the 13th National Games bidding process, Shaanxi, Tianjin, Zhejiang and Hubei were the candidates. Tianjin was announced as host of 2017 National Games of China.

Games

Sports
A total of 341 events in 31 sports were held at the games.

 
 
 
 
 
 
 
 
 
 
 
 
 Slalom (4)
 Sprint (12)
 
 BMX (2)
 Mountain biking (2)
 Road (4)
 Track (10)
 
 Dressage (2)
 Eventing (2)
 Jumping (2)
 
 
 
 
 
 Artistic (14)
 Rhythmic (2)
 Trampoline (4)
 
 
 
 
 
 
 
 
 
 
 
 
 
 Volleyball (4)
 Beach volleyball (2)
 
 
 Freestyle (11)
 Greco-Roman (6)

Participation
A total of 10,217 athletes from 38 delegations took part in the competition (fewer than both the 2005 and 2009 editions). Among the delegations were 4 municipalities, 22 provincial teams and 5 autonomous regions. Further to this, the People's Liberation Army sent a team, and six sports association teams were entered (generally associations from specific industry groupings or large organisations).

Anhui
Beijing
Chongqing
Fujian
Gansu
Guangdong
Guangxi
Guizhou
Hainan
Hebei
Heilongjiang
Henan

Hong Kong
Hubei
Hunan
Jiangsu
Jiangxi
Jilin
Liaoning
Macau
Inner Mongolia
Ningxia
Qinghai

Shaanxi
Shandong
Shanghai
Shanxi
Sichuan
Tianjin
Tibet
Xinjiang
Yunnan
Zhejiang

Coal China Sports Association
Civil Defence and Police Sports Association (前卫体协)
Locomotive Sports Association
People's Liberation Army
Xinjiang Production and Construction Corps

Athletics

Aquatics

Synchronised swimming

Hockey

Shooting

Tennis

References

External links
Official website 

 
2017
2017 in multi-sport events
2017 in Chinese sport
Sports competitions in Tianjin
August 2017 sports events in China
September 2017 sports events in China
21st century in Tianjin